"The End of the Affair?" is the eleventh episode of season 5 on the show, Gossip Girl. The episode was directed by Michael Grossman and written by Sara Goodman. It was aired on January 16, 2012 on the CW. This episode continues the fifth season after a winter break.

Similar to previous names in the TV series, the title of the episode references a work on literature. The title reference is from the 1999 film, The End of the Affair starring Ralph Fiennes.

Plot
The episode starts with a recap of the previous episode, "Riding in Town Cars with Boys" and the title sequence.

Chuck is shown walking his dog and running in to Louis. He asks how's Blair's doing since she lost her baby. Chuck tries to help Louis out of the cold weather and Louis accepts.

A flashback of Chuck and Blair arriving at the hospital after their crash shows and Chuck reaches for Blair's hand but falls limp.

Chuck takes Louis back to Blair's house. As Louis leaves the room, Blair comes down and sees Chuck for the first time since their crash. She says she needs to stay away from Chuck since her wedding is in a month. Chuck asks what happened since the crash and Blair dismisses it with an excuse involving the wedding. Louis mentions that Blair has been distant since the crash and he's becoming so jealous that he's thinking about hiring a private investigator.

Chuck shows up at Dan's loft and questions if he's spoken to Blair. Dan says he hasn't known anything since Gossip Girl is down. Dan refuses to spy on Blair for Chuck and Chuck says he'll do it unless he wants the truth to come out. Chuck leaves and Dan opens a door to which Blair is in. She says, "Chuck can never know."

Dan goes to Serena's and sees her working on her blog. She says her blog is so popular since Gossip Girl hasn't been posting. Nate enters and asks Dan about his new book. He says he hopes that it isn't about all of his friends. They set out to run errands.

Rufus gets off the phone with Jenny who is in London. Lily expresses her concern for Charlie and how she hasn't been speaking to Lily. Rufus tells her pushing Charlie to speak to them would be a mistake.

Dan visits Blair who is in tears. Vera Wang had a dress personally made for Blair but she feels that it reminds her of everything that happened leading up to her crash. Dan suggests she can have another dress made or to not marry Louis if it makes her this unhappy. A woman sees Dan and Blair together and immediately calls Chuck who comes to spy on Blair.

Serena and Nate are busy planning a party when Nate discovers that people have been sending tips to Serena instead of Gossip Girl. He tells her to publish some of them if she doesn't want people going back to Gossip Girl or someone worse.

Dan tells Blair he's tired of lying to people about them hanging out but Blair convinces him not to think about it. Chuck sees them enter a nondescript building.

Nate receives an anonymous text and tells him that the paparazzi didn't cause Chuck and Blair's crash and he needs to do some research. After doing research, he sees the paparazzi definitely did not cause the crash and sets out to talk to the driver.

Chuck calls Dan and confirms that Dan is definitely lying to him. He calls Louis and tells him that Blair is lying. He steps in front a moving car that almost hits him. Chuck goes to see Louis and tells him and Serena that Blair and Dan are hanging out. Chuck and Louis are assuming that Blair is cheating on Louis but Serena defends her. She gives them her computer so they can look through Gossip Girl tips. They find pictures of the two together and plan to reveal her infidelity at the Spectator New Year's Eve party.

Rufus receives a call from Lily's private investigator. He asks Lily about it. She tells him that she hired him to make sure Charlie is okay. Lily finds out that Charlie never left New York.

At the party, Blair and Dan see each other and avoid each other. Chuck and Louis decide that they need to oust them. Serena goes to ask Blair directly. Louis adds a "Most Secret Affair" slide with a picture tipped to Gossip Girl of Blair and Dan together to a presentation set to play publicly at the party.

Serena asks Blair about Dan and she tells her about their friendship through flashbacks. They start out with the scene when Blair is told she lost the baby and Chuck may not make it. She goes to the hospital's chapel and begs God to let Chuck live, vowing to marry Louis and never speak to Chuck again. Instantly, a nurse comes and tells her that Chuck is asking for her. When she goes to see Chuck, she says, "Just because we can't be together doesn't mean I don't love you". Serena tells her it's okay if she changes her mind. Blair reveals that Dan has coming with her to church to consult with a minister about Chuck and what God would want her to do. The minister says it's between her and God. When she goes to look out a window and think about if she could break off her engagement, she sees Chuck walking in front of a cab and almost getting hit. Serena keeps reminding her it's okay to change her mind.

Nate is able to stop the presentation before the "Most Secret Affair" slide comes up. Chuck and Louis ask Dan why he's seeing Blair so much when Serena comes and lies, saying that her and Dan are actually dating but didn't want to say anything until they knew it was going to work.

Rufus finds Lily in an art institute waiting for Charlie to show. When Lily sees Charlie, it turns out to be another Charlotte Rhodes but she goes by Lola. They apologize and go home.

Louis meets Blair in the restroom and apologizes for being too suspicious. He tells her that he knows Serena was dating Dan and Blair was covering up for her. Louis tells her he feels she is being distant since the crash. She seems like she's going to tell the whole truth, but ends up telling Louis she's converting to Catholism like he had wanted for a while.

Nate meets with the driver of Chuck and Blair's limo. The driver tells him that the brakes were acting weird when he was driving. He later speaks to the limo service and it turns out that Blair was the one that called the car.

Dan goes to talk to Chuck. Chuck tells him he knows he's lying about Blair and that nothing could keep him away from Blair. He commits himself to finding out what the truth is between Dan and Blair.

At midnight, Serena and Dan kiss and some old feelings reignite. Blair and Louis kiss and Chuck sees them. Blair notices and instantly feels guilty.

Serena goes to see Nate and tells him she's going to go through her tips that were e-mailed to her and somehow publish them in a positive way.

Lily decides to take the private investigator off the Charlie case.

Blair goes to Chuck and tells him that he is an amazing person and she hopes that her marrying Louis doesn't ruin that. He asks for a reason why she doesn't love him anymore. She tells him that he will never know and they will never be together. He tells her he's going to find out why she's no longer in love with her. She tells him, "Just because we can't be together doesn't mean I don't love you" and he remembers that night in the hospital.

At the end of the episode, Lola pulls her ID out from her wallet that has a picture of her and Carol together. Also, Nate discovers that Blair and Chuck had gotten in the limo ordered for him that night. He instantly texts the unknown number and they say, "How about we help each other? XOXO Gossip Girl."

End of episode

External links
 Gossip Girl official website
 Gossip Girl Season 5

Gossip Girl (season 5) episodes
2012 American television episodes